Bedazzled is a 1967 British comedy DeLuxe Color film directed and produced by Stanley Donen in Panavision format. It was written by comedian Peter Cook and starred both Cook and his comedy partner Dudley Moore. It is a comic retelling of the Faust legend, set in the Swinging London of the 1960s. The Devil (Cook) offers an unhappy young man (Moore) seven wishes in return for his soul, but twists the spirit of the wishes to frustrate the man's hopes.

Plot
Stanley Moon works as a cook in a Wimpy restaurant and is infatuated with the waitress, Margaret Spencer, but lacks confidence and is too socially inhibited to approach her. In despair at his life, he attempts suicide by hanging but is interrupted by George Spiggot, a man claiming to be the Devil. When Stanley accuses George of being delusional, he offers Stanley a "trial wish". Stanley wishes for a raspberry ice lolly, and George takes him to buy one from a nearby shop.

George is in a game with God: if he is first to claim 100 billion souls, he will be readmitted to Heaven. He is also busy with minor acts of vandalism and spite, helped by his staff of the seven deadly sins, especially Lust and Envy. In return for his soul, George offers Stanley seven wishes. Stanley uses these trying to satisfy his love for Margaret, but George twists his words to frustrate him. All of Stanley's wish scenes feature characters played by Peter Cook, George explaining that "There's a little of me in everyone." George tells Stanley that blowing a raspberry will free him from the effects of a wish if he changes his mind.

 Stanley first wishes to be more articulate. George turns him into a talkative, pretentious intellectual with a strong Welsh accent. Margaret becomes equally pretentious and enthusiastically agrees with all of Stanley's beliefs. Stanley stresses the importance of breaking free from one's social and moral constraints. When Stanley makes his move, however, she is horrified and starts screaming "Rape!".
 Stanley wishes to be a multi-millionaire with Margaret as his "very physical" wife. She ignores him and his lavish gifts, including the original Mona Lisa, instead being physical with other men.
 Stanley wishes to be a pop singer. However, his fame is quickly usurped by a new band, Drimble Wedge and The Vegetation, whose lead singer performs the psychedelic rock song "Bedazzled" in a hypnotic, monotone voice about his disdain for anyone except himself. Margaret, one of many entranced groupies, screams with excitement as she and other fans mob Drimble. 
 Stanley comments in passing that he wishes he were "a fly on the wall" and George turns them both into literal flies on the wall in a morgue, where a police inspector shows Margaret various dead bodies, hoping that she will identify one as Stanley. When the inspector invites Margaret to a vice squad party, Stanley launches an attack on him, only to be felled with bug spray.
 Stanley wishes for a quiet life in the countryside, with children, and Margaret making the anniversary dinner. It soon becomes apparent, however, that Margaret is another man's wife. While deeply in love, even the attempt to consummate their affection drives both Stanley and Margaret into emotional agony.
 Stanley attempts to frame a sixth wish that George cannot ruin for him. He wishes that he and Margaret loved one another, lived away from the big city with no other men around, and would always be together. However, George turns him into a nun of the Order of Saint Beryl, or the Leaping Beryllians, who glorify their founder by jumping on trampolines (expanding on a sketch that previously appeared in Cook and Moore's TV series Not Only... But Also). Margaret is also a nun in the order, but refuses to consider consummating their love as they are both women. Stanley attempts to escape the wish by blowing a raspberry, to no effect, and he returns to London to confront George.
 When Stanley tries to use his seventh wish, George reveals he has already used it: his trial wish for an ice lolly.

Ultimately, George spares Stanley eternal damnation because he has exceeded his quota of 100 billion souls and can afford to be generous. George ascends to Heaven, where God's disembodied voice rejects him again; Saint Peter explains that when he gave Stanley back his soul, George did the right thing, but with the wrong motive. Thinking he can nullify this by reclaiming Stanley's soul, George tries and fails to stop Stanley from burning his contract, which causes Stanley to return to his old job and life, wiser and more clear-sighted.

Back at the restaurant, Stanley finally asks Margaret to dinner, and although she says she's already doing something, she suggests meeting another night. Stanley smiles, happy that he has found the courage to talk to her. George tries to entice Stanley again, but Stanley tells him he would rather start a relationship with Margaret his own way. Frustrated, George leaves and threatens revenge on God by unleashing all the tawdry and shallow technological curses of the modern age while God triumphantly laughs.

Cast

Soundtrack 
Moore wrote Bedazzled's soundtrack, which was performed by the Dudley Moore Trio. The title track, Moore's best known song, was performed within the movie by the fictional psychedelic rock band Drimble Wedge and the Vegetation, featuring Cook's character as the vocalist. The piece has since been covered widely, including performances by Tony Hatch and Nick Cave. Moore recorded several instrumental versions.

Novelisation 
In 1968 Sphere Books published a novelisation of the Cook and Moore screenplay written by Michael J. Bird.

Reception

Box office
According to Fox records the film required $2,100,000 in rentals to break even and made $2,825,000.

Critical response
The film was well received in the UK but had mixed reviews in the United States. Film aggregator Rotten Tomatoes gave it a 74% approval rating based on 38 reviews, with a weighted average of 7.6/10.
Bosley Crowther of The New York Times called it a "pretentiously metaphorical picture" which becomes "awfully precious and monotonous and eventually ... fags out in sheer bad taste." Crowther does, however, compliment Donen for his "colorful and graphic" mise-en-scène. On the other hand, Roger Ebert compared the film's humour to that of Bob and Ray. He enthusiastically called Bedazzleds satire "barbed and contemporary ... dry and understated," and overall, a "magnificently photographed, intelligent, very funny film".

The unattributed and undated review in the Time Out Film Guide 2009 describes the film as a "hit and miss affair" which is "good fun sometimes", but suffers from a "threadbare" plot. The Virgin Film Guide says "Cook and Moore brilliantly shift from character to character with just a change of voice (not unlike Peter Sellers), and the movie never flags".

Remake
In 2000, 20th Century Fox released an American remake by the same name, with Brendan Fraser as Elliot Richards (counterpart to Moore's role) and Elizabeth Hurley as the Devil.

References

Bibliography

External links 

 
 
 
 

1967 films
1967 comedy films
Films about wish fulfillment
Films directed by Stanley Donen
Films set in London
Works based on the Faust legend
British comedy films
The Devil in film
Seven deadly sins in popular culture
20th Century Fox films
1960s English-language films
1960s British films